Alexander Ogilvie may refer to:

Alexander Walker Ogilvie (1829–1902), Canadian politician
Alec Ogilvie (1882–1962), British aviation pioneer